Marc Edward Schonbrun is an American guitarist based in the San Francisco Bay Area. He has produced notable works based on his skill as a guitar/synthesizer expert including books, DVDs, and CDs. After graduating magna cum laude from the Crane School of Music, Schonbrun has performed at various venues including The Tralf Music Hall (Buffalo, New York), and Lincoln Center (New York).

Schonbrun is endorsed by D'Addario Strings, Planet Waves Accessories, Godin Guitars, and Flite Sound Speakers.

Schonbrun continues to work as a professional speaker for various companies, authoring books and DVDs, teaching guitar, and theory in private lessons. In addition to his work as a musician, Schonbrun is an audio engineer and records classical and small chamber ensemble music.

Books
The Everything Rock & Blues Guitar Book: From Chords to Scales and Licks to Tricks, All You Need to Play Like the Greats 
The Everything Home Recording Book: From 4-track to digital 
How to Play the Guitar Rock and Blues Manual - Spanish Translation 
The Everything Reading Music Book: A Step-By-Step Introduction To Understanding Music Notation and Theory 
The Everything Guitar Chords: Rock-Blues-Jazz-Country-Classical-Folk: Over 2,000 Chords for Every Style of Music 
Digital Guitar Power!: The Comprehensive Guide 
The Everything Music Theory Book: A Complete Guide to Taking Your Understanding of Music to the Next Level 
The Efficient Guitarist Book 1, Second Edition (Self-Published)
Mastering Sibelius 5  
The Everything Guitar Scales Book with CD: Over 700 Scale Patterns for Every Style of Music 
The Everything Guide To Digital Home Recording: Tips, Tools, and Techniques For Studio Sound St Home 
The Everything Music Theory Book 2nd Edition: A Complete Guide to Taking Your Understanding of Music to the Next Level

DVDs
Geek Guitar
The Efficient Guitarist

References

External links
Marc Schonbrun Online

American blues guitarists
American male guitarists
American rock guitarists
Living people
Crane School of Music alumni
Year of birth missing (living people)
Place of birth missing (living people)
Musicians from the San Francisco Bay Area
Guitarists from California